The women's 1000 metres in short track speed skating at the 2014 Winter Olympics was held between 18 and 21 February 2014 at the Iceberg Skating Palace in Sochi, Russia.

The qualifying heats was held on 18 February with the quarterfinal, the semifinal and the final on 21 February.

The defending Olympic Champion and World Champion is Wang Meng of China. Meng qualified to compete at the Games but broke her ankle in a collision with a teammate while practicing for the games in January 2014.

Qualification
Countries were assigned quotas using a combination of the four special Olympic Qualification classifications that were held at two world cups in November 2013. A nation may enter a maximum of three athletes per event. For this event a total of 32 athletes representing 18 nations qualified to compete.

Results
The event was started at 20:44.

Preliminaries

Heats
 Q – qualified for Quarterfinals
 ADV – advanced
 PEN – penalty

Quarterfinal
 Q – qualified for Semifinals
 ADV – advanced
 PEN – penalty

Semifinals

Finals

Final B (classification round)

Final A (medal round)

References

Women's short track speed skating at the 2014 Winter Olympics